Hassan Houri (born February 11, 1985) is an Iranian footballer who plays for Sanat Naft in the Iran Pro League.

Club career
In 2009, Houri joined Sanat Naft Abadan F.C. after spending the previous season at Mes Kerman. He became Sanat Naft capitan in 2015.

References

Living people
People from Andimeshk
Foolad FC players
Sanat Naft Abadan F.C. players
Sanat Mes Kerman F.C. players
Mes Sarcheshme players
Persian Gulf Pro League players
Azadegan League players
Iranian footballers
1985 births
Association football goalkeepers
Sportspeople from Khuzestan province